Markus Josef Schwabl (born 26 August 1990) is a German professional footballer who plays as a right-back or as a defensive midfielder for SpVgg Unterhaching.

Club career
On 28 August 2014, his contract with 1860 Munich was cancelled and he returned to 3. Liga side SpVgg Unterhaching after only a year.

On 20 January 2017, Schwabl signed for English League One side Fleetwood Town on a two-year contract for an undisclosed fee. Upon signing for Fleetwood, manager Uwe Rosler stated that he was 'very fit and very professional in his day to day work' and that 'he will offer us a lot of energy in midfield'. He made his debut for Fleetwood Town the following day as a substitute in a 1–0 victory away to Coventry City.

His contract was cancelled by Fleetwood Town at the end of the 2017–18 season.

On 2 July 2018, Schwabl returned to SpVgg Unterhaching and signed a three-year contract with the club.

Personal life
He is the son of former West Germany international Manfred Schwabl.

Career statistics

References

External links
 
 
 

1990 births
Living people
Association football fullbacks
Association football midfielders
German footballers
SpVgg Unterhaching players
SpVgg Unterhaching II players
TSV 1860 Munich players
Fleetwood Town F.C. players
3. Liga players
2. Bundesliga players
English Football League players
German expatriate footballers
Expatriate footballers in England
German expatriate sportspeople in England